Carpeneto is a comune (municipality) in the Province of Alessandria in the Italian region of Piedmont.

Carpeneto borders the following municipalities: Montaldo Bormida, Predosa, Rocca Grimalda, Sezzadio, and Trisobbio.

The Baroque church of San Giorgio serves as the main Roman Catholic parish for the comune.

References

Cities and towns in Piedmont